Joseph Atsumi Misue (24 April 1936 – 28 June 2016) was a Japanese Roman Catholic bishop.

Ordained to the priesthood in 1963, Misue served as bishop of the Roman Catholic Diocese of Hiroshima, Japan, from 1985 to 2011.

Notes

1936 births
2016 deaths
21st-century Roman Catholic bishops in Japan
20th-century Roman Catholic bishops in Japan
Japanese Roman Catholic bishops